Kalamazoo is an unincorporated community in Barbour County, West Virginia, United States. Its post office  has been closed.

References

Unincorporated communities in Barbour County, West Virginia
Unincorporated communities in West Virginia